Největší z Čechů is a 2010 Czech drama film by Robert Sedláček. The story is about a team of four filmmakers.

Set in Pelhřimov, the film was shot during the Festival of Records and Curiosities. The film began shooting in August 2009, also filming in Prague on Střelecký Island.

References

External links
 
 Největší z Čechů at Film Database.cz 

2010 films
2010s Czech-language films
2010 drama films
Czech Film Critics' Awards winners
Czech drama films